The Muturi River is a river in West Papua province, Indonesia.

Geography
The river flows in the West Papua province with predominantly tropical rainforest climate (designated as Af in the Köppen-Geiger climate classification). The annual average temperature in the area is 21 °C. The warmest month is October, when the average temperature is around 24 °C, and the coldest is January, at 19 °C. The average annual rainfall is 3835 mm. The wettest month is March, with an average of 385 mm rainfall, and the driest is October, with 173 mm rainfall.

See also
List of rivers of Indonesia

References

Rivers of West Papua (province)
Rivers of Indonesia